Hu Sanniang (literally "Third Sister Hu") is a fictional character in Water Margin, one of the Four Great Classical Novels in Chinese literature. Nicknamed "Ten Feet of Blue", she ranks 59th among the 108 Stars of Destiny and 23rd among the 72 Earthly Fiends.

Background
Hu Sanniang is the daughter of Squire Hu, who owns the Hu Family Manor that stands with the Li Family Manor and the Zhu Family Manor on the Lone Dragon Ridge. The ridge is believed to be in present-day Dongping County, Shandong province. Hu, who fights with a pair of sabres, could battle with dozens of men at the same time. She is also an expert thrower of a lasso, which she uses to catch her foes. She dons an armour over a red robe, a silk belt and a golden helmet when she goes into a battle.

Fighting the Liangshan outlaws
Hu Sanniang is engaged to Zhu Biao, the third son of Zhu Chaofeng, the master of the Zhu Family Village. Hostile to the bandits of Liangshan, the Zhus refuse to release Shi Qian, whom they have captured after he stole a rooster for meal from an inn they own while on the way to join the stronghold. Song Jiang leads a military attack on the Zhus to settle the acrimony. After its futile first offensive, Liangshan launches a second one, which draws Hu Sanniang to come to the aid of the Zhus.

Hu Sanniang comes charging on a horse at Song Jiang's army, from whose ranks emerges Wang Ying, who is excited to see a pretty lady warrior and believes she is an easy prey. However, he underestimates the amazon, who detects that he has some indecent intent. Overwhelming Wang with her sabres, she suddenly leans forward, pulls him off his horse and throws him to the ground. Zhu's men rush forward to tie Wang up.

Hu Sanniang shows no sign of weariness as she battles with Ou Peng and then Ma Lin. Suddenly Song Jiang finds himself being pursued by Hu on horse as his troops retreat in disarray. Hu comes close to seizing him when Lin Chong appears and sets upon her. She is defeated and seized by the far superior fighter. Song Jiang sends her in captivity to Liangshan, where she is placed under the watch of his father.

Joining Liangshan
Hu Sanniang's brother Hu Cheng comes to Song Jiang's army to plead for the release of his sister. Song agrees on the condition that any Zhu fleeing to him must be given over to Liangshan. When the outlaws finally overrun the Zhu Family Manor, thanks to the infiltration by Sun Li, Zhu Biao flees to the Hu Family Manor. Hu Cheng takes him captive for delivery to Liangshan. Along the way, they run into Li Kui, who hacks Zhu Biao to death while Hu Cheng runs away unscathed. Li Kui charges into the Hu Family Manor and slaughters every person he comes upon. He is later reprimanded by Song for the rash killing.

Back at Liangshan, Song Jiang convinces Hu Sanniang, who has become the god daughter of his father while under the old man's care, to join Liangshan. Song also arranges for her to marry Wang Ying in fulfilment of his promise at Mount Qingfeng to find him a wife. Hu makes many contributions to Liangshan, including capturing Peng Qi, who has come to exterminate Liangshan under the imperial general Huyan Zhuo.

Campaigns and death
Hu Sanniang is appointed as one of the leaders of Liangshan's cavalry after the 108 Stars of Destiny came together in what is called the Grand Assembly. She participates in the campaigns against the Liao invaders and rebel forces in Song territory following amnesty from Emperor Huizong for Liangshan.

In the battle of Muzhou (睦州; in present-day Hangzhou, Zhejiang) in the campaign against Fang La, Hu Sanniang and Wang Ying encounter Zheng Biao, one of Fang's generals. Zhang uses his sorcery to disorientate Wang and kill him. Over anxious to avenge her husband, Hu is killed by Zheng's flying magical gold bricks.

References
 
 
 
 
 
 
 

72 Earthly Fiends
Fictional swordfighters
Fictional women soldiers and warriors
Fictional characters from Shandong